The eighth season of the Showtime drama series Dexter premiered on June 30, 2013, and concluded on September 22 of the same year. The season follows Dexter Morgan, who is forced to deal with his past when he comes across Dr. Evelyn Vogel, an expert on psychiatry who returns to Miami. Nicknamed the Psychopath Whisperer, she claims to have structured the code for him alongside Harry. This season also deals with a new serial killer in Miami who removes pieces of the victims' brains, and with Debra, who is trying to deal with her actions in the previous season. Originally serving as the final season, Dexter returned as a limited series in 2021, titled Dexter: New Blood.

Cast

Main 
 Michael C. Hall as Dexter Morgan
 Jennifer Carpenter as Debra Morgan
 Desmond Harrington as Joey Quinn
 C. S. Lee as Vince Masuka
 David Zayas as Angel Batista
 Aimee Garcia as Jamie Batista
 Geoff Pierson as Deputy Chief Tom Matthews
 James Remar as Harry Morgan

Special Guest Stars
 Charlotte Rampling as Dr. Evelyn Vogel
 Yvonne Strahovski as Hannah McKay

Recurring
 Sean Patrick Flanery as Jacob Elway
 Dora Madison Burge as Niki Walters
 Dana L. Wilson as Det. Angie Miller
 Darri Ingolfsson as Oliver Saxon/Daniel Vogel
 Bethany Joy Lenz as Cassie Jollenston
 Sam Underwood as Zach Hamilton
 Kenny Johnson as U.S. Marshal Max Clayton
 Scott Michael Morgan as Lyle Sussman
 John D'Aquino as Ed Hamilton
 Nick Gomez as Javier Guzman/El Sapo
 Aaron McCusker as A.J. Yates
 Valerie Cruz as Sylvia Prado
 Nicole LaLiberte as Arlene Schram

Guest stars
 Rhys Coiro as Andrew Briggs 
 Barbara Tarbuck as Ms. Sussman
 Rebecca Staab as Lucy Gerard
 Andrew Elvis Miller as Ron Galuzzo
 Rolando Molina as Armando
 David Chisum as Kevin Wyman
 Julian Sands as Miles Castner

Production 
On March 1, 2013, Jennifer Carpenter reported on her Twitter that Michael C. Hall would be directing the second episode of season 8, which was his directing debut.

On April 18, 2013, Showtime officially announced that the eighth season would be the show's last.

On May 9, 2013, the official Dexter Facebook fanpage posted a behind the scenes photo of a clapper showing that episode 6 of season 8 would be directed by John Dahl.

Episodes

Reception 
According to Metacritic, the early response to Season 8 was mostly positive, the first two episodes of the season received a score of 71 out of 100. With a few episodes left in the season, Rolling Stone opined that Dexter is still "cleverly written and has a core cast of characters we care for", concluding that "everyone's favorite serial killer still has some gas left in his tank".
However, as the season went on, reception dropped drastically. The post-season reception was extremely negative. IGN gave the season as a whole a 5.5, citing poor writing and the ending as two of the reasons for its poor quality. The A.V. Club gave the season as a whole a D−.

Series finale episode 
The series finale met a mixed and polarized response, although the majority opinion was negative. Mary McNamara of the Los Angeles Times praised Carpenter's performance as worthy of an Emmy nomination and argued that "the parting scenes between Dexter and Deb, possibly the most powerful sibling bond television has ever seen, gave the show the send-off it deserved". Mike Hale of The New York Times said he "bought the ending", and fans "may or may not think that Dexter's final resting place is the one he deserves. But it works". Entertainment Weekly championed the series finale as "the best Dexter episode in years. ... It was also one of the strangest episodes in the show's history ... It's like watching a different series, one that was more compelling than the show it served to close."

Other responses to the finale were scathingly negative. Joshua Alston of The A.V. Club gave the episode an "F" and argued that the writers botched "the landing" by choosing ambiguity to avoid the conflict of "whether or not [fans] wanted Dexter to get away with it." Frazier Moore of the Associated Press called the ending sappy, sloppy, and a "cop-out". Richard Lawson of The Atlantic Monthly described the finale as an "unbelievably unsatisfying end [which] ruins all that came before it", including Dexter's universally acclaimed seasons 1–4.

Showtime president David Nevins praised the series finale, defending it against fan backlash by saying: "The fundamental design of where they ended Dexter was really well conceived. He had to sacrifice the one person who was closest to him in the world, and he had to leave. That was where it was headed for a very long time." Nevins also said there were never any discussions to kill off Dexter, and they didn't just keep the character alive for a potential spinoff series, which as of January 2014 they were discussing making. In October 2020, it was announced that Dexter would return with a 10-episode limited series starring Michael C. Hall reprising his role with Clyde Phillips as showrunner.

References

Further reading

External links 

 
 

 
2013 American television seasons